Mirny is a rural locality (a settlement) in Kletnyansky District, Bryansk Oblast, Russia. The population was 701 as of 2010. There are 10 streets.

Geography 
Mirny is located 18 km west of Kletnya (the district's administrative centre) by road. Kharitonovka is the nearest rural locality.

References 

Rural localities in Kletnyansky District